Franz Mileder (born 1891, date of death unknown) was an Austrian wrestler. He competed in the Greco-Roman heavyweight event at the 1924 Summer Olympics. At the 1911 Unofficial World Championships, Mileder won a bronze medal.

References

External links
 

1891 births
Year of death missing
Olympic wrestlers of Austria
Wrestlers at the 1924 Summer Olympics
Austrian male sport wrestlers
Place of birth missing